Free, is the fifth studio album from the Filipino rock band, Rivermaya. It has 10 tracks and was released on August 30, 2000 by the band independently, literally given away for free which is another first for any Filipino artist or artist previously signed with a major label. “Free” was also named Album of the Year in the NU Rock Awards 2000. This was the last album to feature Nathan Azarcon who left the band in 2001, he eventually returned in 2016.

The song "Imbecillesque" was re-released on their 2005 EP entitled "You'll Be Safe Here". The song "Straight No Chaser" was later covered by actor and reggae artist Boy2 Quizon.

On the back cover of the album, tracks #7 and #8 were typed incorrectly as in the order of the songs in the album.

Track listing

Personnel
Adapted from the liner notes.

Rivermaya
 Rico Blanco – guitars, vocals (all tracks except 3 and 8), keyboards, synthesizer
 Nathan Azarcon – bass, vocals (tracks 3 and 8)
 Mark Escueta – drums, percussion

Production

 Rico Blanco – producer, cover art
 Angee Rozul – engineer

References

External links
 The Real Deal - RiverMaya Free (by Liza Nakpil)
 Full Album Download Links

2000 albums
Rivermaya albums
Tagalog-language albums